Marie Růžičková (born November 18, 1986) is a Slovak basketball player for Reyer Venezia and the Slovak national team.

She participated at the EuroBasket Women 2017.

References

1986 births
Living people
Slovak women's basketball players
Sportspeople from Trenčín
Centers (basketball)
Slovak expatriate basketball people in Italy